The Latvijas Universitāte men's basketball team represents University of Latvia in Riga, Latvia, also known as LU. and it plays in the Latvian Basketball League and Latvian-Estonian Basketball League.

The LU once won seven Latvian championships in the 1930s and returned to the Latvian League Division 1 before the 2010-11 season. The biggest accomplishment so far has been 4th place in the 2011-2012 season.

Team is organized by University of Latvia.

2022-23 Roster

 

|}
| valign="top" |
 Head coach
 
 Assistant coaches 
 
 Conditioning coach
 
 Sports director
 
 General director
 
Legend
(C) Team captain
|}

Depth chart

Coaches 
 Mārtiņš Zībarts: 2010-2011
 Artūrs Visockis-Rubenis: 2011-2016 
 Guntis Endzels: 2016–2022
 Gunārs Gailītis: 2022–present

External links
Official website 

University of Latvia
Basketball teams in Latvia